Strathclair Airport  is located  west of Strathclair, Manitoba, Canada.

References

Registered aerodromes in Manitoba